Sabicea cinerea, the largeflower woodvine, is a species of flowering plant in the family Rubiaceae. It is a perennial dicot with both vine and shrub growth habits. It is a native plant of Puerto Rico.

References

External links

 S. cinerea photos on Flickr licensed under various Creative Commons licenses
 
 

cinerea
Flora of Puerto Rico
Flora of northern South America
Flora without expected TNC conservation status